Utah State Route 120 may refer to:

Utah State Route 120 (1931-1935), a former state highway from Tropic to Henrieville 
Utah State Route 120 (1935-1945), a former state highway from SR-56 to Iron Mountain
Utah State Route 120 (1945-1969), a former state highway from Enterprise to the Nevada line
Utah State Route 120, the modern route through Richfield

See also
 List of highways numbered 120